Vitali Yuryevich Galysh (born 13 May 1990) is a Russian former professional football player.

Club career
He made his Russian Football National League debut for FC Ufa on 9 July 2012 in a game against PFC Spartak Nalchik.

External links
 
 

1990 births
Footballers from Saint Petersburg
Living people
Russian footballers
Association football forwards
Russia youth international footballers
FC Ufa players
FC Yenisey Krasnoyarsk players
FC Sokol Saratov players
FC Sibir Novosibirsk players
FC Dynamo Stavropol players
FC Tolyatti players